Tania Vanessa Rincón Sánchez (born December 15, 1986 in La Piedad, Michoacán) is a Mexican model and television presenter.

After winning the 2006 Nuestra Belleza Michoacán pageant, Tania Rincón obtained the right of representing her state in the national Nuestra Belleza México 2006 competition, in which she eventually reached the top 10 and was presented with the contest's annual Academic Award.

Rincón later went on to pursue a television career and became host of Fox Sports Latinoamérica's Lo mejor de Fox Sports and also joined the cast of the entertainment morning talk show Venga la alegría on TV Azteca. In  August 2014, Rincón helped to raise awareness of the disease ALS by participating in the Ice Bucket Challenge.

References

1986 births
Living people
Mexican female models
Mexican television presenters
Mexican beauty pageant winners
People from La Piedad
Models from Michoacán
Mexican women television presenters